Farallon Negro is a volcano in the Catamarca province of Argentina. Active between about 9-8 million years ago, it was formerly a stratovolcano or a multi vent volcano. Eventually, erosion removed most of the volcano and exposed the underlying structure including subvolcanic intrusions.

The remnants of the volcano are the sites of mining operations.

Geography and structure 

Farallon Negro is located in the Argentine Catamarca province, in the Sierra de Belén and north of the Pipanaco basin. It may be the largest volcanic field in the Argentine foreland. The local climate is arid and temperatures range .

It is located between the tectonic region of the Sierras Pampeanas and the Puna. Said volcanism took place between 12 and 5 mya ago.

Farallon Negro probably is a stratovolcano which has been degraded by erosion, resulting in the exposure of intrusive bodies. Another theory suggests that Farallon Negro was a multi-vent complex. These include the Agua Rica and Bajo de la Alumbrera porphyry centres and the Agua Tapada and Bajo el Durazno intrusion. Most of the volcanic products of Farallon Negro are lava flows and breccia. The volcanic vent for most of the Farallon Negro products appears to be in the general area of Alto de la Blenda, suggesting that it is the location of the vent. Volcanic units at Durazno are somewhat different from those in the main complex. Lava domes are sometimes surrounded by ash and block flows.

Intrusive volcanics form much of the exposed complex. In Bayo de la Alumbrera, a dacite complex is embedded within pyroclastic rocks and trachyandesites. Around the Alto de la Blenda monzonite a number of stocks ( wide) and dikes originate, which indicates it may be a remnant of the conduit. In some stocks magma mixing appears to have occurred during formation; in Alto de la Alumbrera first felsic and at the end mafic rocks were formed. Several dykes and stocks were injected into andesite during the formation of Bajo de la Alumbrera. Many of these stocks have suffered hydrothermal alteration extending into surrounding rocks shortly after their formation including propylitic alteration, but the later stocks show no evidence of alteration. This pattern probably occurred because strong volcanic activity during the earliest intrusions did leak away fluids before they could trigger alteration. When volcanic activity dropped, trapped fluids could then initiate hydrothermal alteration. This probably coincided with a change in the local stress regime that reduced volcanic activity. Faults and fractures have influenced the alteration. In Bajo de la Alumbrera, this alteration has given place to magnetite and anhydrite inclusions which indicated the rocks were highly oxidized. Phyllic (pyrite-quartz-sericite) and potassic (biotite-orthoclase) alteration is noticeable in satellite images of Bajo de la Alumbrera. Agua Rica, another exposed deposit, is cut by the Quebradas Mina valley. It is subdivided in the Seca and Trampeadero porphyries. Two diatremes are also found, one of which is named El Espanto.

Rock chemistry and isotope analysis suggests that at first the Farallon Negro system was not underpinned by a magma chamber. Starting in 8.5 mya then a heterogeneous magma chamber was probably established, with an increasing content of felsic rocks at its roof. This magma chamber probably had a heterogeneous composition.

Geology 

Subduction of the Nazca Plate between 28° and 33° southern latitude flattened starting 18 million years ago, causing arc volcanism to propagate to the Sierras Pampeanas. Subduction of a segment of the Juan Fernández Ridge may have triggered this shallowing. 10 million years ago, volcanism ceased in the main Andean chain in this segment, probably because the mantle wedge was thinned by the flattening of the subduction. North and south of this segment subduction is steeper and volcanism persists to the present day.

Farallon Negro is located in the border zone between the flat subduction zone and the zone of steeper subduction farther north that has generated the Central Volcanic Zone. A number of volcanoes in this transitional zone are found on northwest trending lineaments; this includes Cerro Negro de Chorillos, Farallon Negro, Galán and Cerro Tuzgle. The Tucuman fault zone is located in the area.

Local 

The basement in the Farallon Negro area of the Sierras Pampeanas are schists and gneisses of deep water origin with an intruded batholith of Ordovician-Silurian age. This plutonic activity coincided with the collision of South America with eastern North America during that time. The Sierras Pampeanas are formed by several chains of mountains of Proterozoic-Paleozoic age with valleys separating them. During the Pliocene-Pleistocene separate basement blocks were upfolded. These geological patterns are similar to the Laramide orogeny in North America and may be a general pattern of mountain building over flat subduction. This formation was probably formed in episodic events such as flash floods. Rocks of the Paleozoic basement beneath Farallon Negro contain amphibolite, mica schist, phyllite and quartzite.

Farallon Negro itself is found between the Sierra de Aconquija in the east and the Sierra de Quilmes in the north. Both of these are Paleozoic basement blocks with Farallon Negro found in a depression between these. The volcanites were erupted through a crystalline basement including batholits and metasedimentary rock.

Geologic record 

Farallon Negro is extensively eroded, almost down to its Paleozoic basement. Erosion took place between the Miocene and the Pliocene considering that volcanic rocks are buried beneath Pliocene conglomerates.

Composition 

Basaltic andesite and andesite constitute the bulk of Farallon Negro volcanisms. Dacites and basalt also occur. The Bajo de la Alumbrera porphyry deposit is found in shoshonite. They are heterogeneous in composition, with several phases dominated by hornblende, plagioclase and pyroxene. Magnetite and biotite are also present. Generally, early rocks are mafic and the late ones intermediate or silicic. Magma mixing may have played a role in the formation of the rocks; specifically andesites formed from the mixing of basaltic-lamprophyric melts with dacitic-rhyolitic ones within andesitic rocks. Overall composition is potassium-rich calc-alkaline. Isotope compositions are typical for a mature volcanic arc.

The bottom of the volcanic pile forms breccias that were presumably emplaced by flood-like flows. Sedimentary rocks, dykes and lava flows are also found. In the upper layers, lava flows and lava domes are found. Again there are also sedimentary rocks. Some deposits may be debris flow deposits, phreatomagmatic deposits are also found.

Alteration products have been analyzed at Bajo de la Alumbrera. Gold-containing pyrite and chalcopyrite, bornite and enargite are the main gold containing minerals. Hydrothermal orthoclase and quartz as well as hydrothermal assemblages of anhydrite, biotite and magnetite are also found. An earlier argyllic (clay) cap over the deposit was eroded away. Alto de la Blenda has shown the presence of chalcopyrite, galena, pyrite, sphalerite, tennantite-tetrahedrite. Agua Rica displays covellite, enargite, galena, marcasite, molybdenite, pyrite, sphalerite, sulfur and tetrahedrite, formed first as a porphyry that was subsequently modified by hydrothermal piping.

Some mineralization was directed by fluids which exhaled from the magma chamber into surrounding rocks after a period of volcanic rest. Inclusions in rocks demonstrate that these fluids included brine and sulfide-rich fluids. These sulfide containing brines and fluids extracted much of the gold and copper from the bulk rocks, causing them to be poorer in Au and Cu than the melts.

Eruptive history 

The oldest age reported is 9.4±0.3 mya for a lava flow in Bayo el Durazno, but undateable units stratigraphically older than this flow are present. Until 8.05±0.37 mya activity in the central cone occurred, between 8.0±0.2 and 7.27±0.35 mya Cerro Durazno was active.

Of the intrusions, the Tampa Tampa andesites between Alto de la Blenda and Bajo el Durazno formed first at 9.0±0.2 mya. Bajo el Durazno formed a porphyry at 8.39±0.18 mya. The Las Casitas rhyolite and the Chilca andesite porphyry have comparable ages of 8.0±0.12 and 8.0±0.11 mya. The Alto de la Blenda stock was formed 7.55±0.3 mya. Agua Tapada was formed 7.35±0.16 mya. Las Pampitas was emplaced 7.22±0.28 mya. Bajo de San Lukas was emplaced 7.1 mya. 6.98±0.08–6.78±0.15 the Bajo de la Alumbrera intrusion was formed. 6.18±0.05 and 6.04±0.07 mya the Loma Morada and Macho Muerto rocks were emplaced. The Quebrada de los Leones rhyolites are the youngest intrusions but aren't dated isotopically.

Evidence indicates that in the beginning the Farallon Negro volcano grew rapidly, at least in the northwest sector and then growth petered out. Towards the end of activity around 7.3 mya a caldera collapse may have occurred. Composition of the eruptive products changed over the lifespan of the system. The main volcanism (9.2–6.8 mya) was andesitic-dacitic. During the intrusive phase (8.0–6.2 mya) magma was initially basaltic andesite and later rhyolite.

Mining 

A mine of copper and gold is found within Bajo de la Alumbrera, opened in July 1997. It is estimated that it will be one of the ten largest copper mines in the world in full production, and one of the largest gold mines in South America. Some copper mining began already in 1970s but a major open pit mine was opened in February 1998. Two mines are also operated in Alto de la Alumbrera, the Farallon Negro mine opened in 1978 and Alto de la Alumbrera opened in 1986.

It is estimated that Bajo de la Alumbrera contains  of copper.  The mineralization may have originated in mafic magmas. The formation process of these deposits is insofar different from that of other Andean porphyry deposits as it was formed by several hydrothermal systems that were separated only by a few million years, while e.g. the copper porphyry El Salvador formed during episodic magmatic activity.

References

Sources 

</ref>

http://www.e-sga.org/fileadmin/sga/newsletter/news28/SGANews28.pdf

Volcanoes of Argentina
Miocene stratovolcanoes